Djakarta Warehouse Project (DWP) is a dance music festival held in Jakarta, Indonesia. It is one of the largest annual dance music festivals in Asia, featuring dance music artists from around the world.

History
The festival originated from a nightclub event in 2008 called Blowfish Warehouse Project at Jakarta's renowned night club Blowfish. Featuring 3 arenas within the club's vicinity, the festival's first edition boasted more than 5.000 audience. The second edition of the festival was planned to be held on 24 April 2010. However, a fight broke out three weeks before the planned date of the festival, damaging parts of the venue. Organisers moved the festival to Pantai Carnaval in Ancol and rebranded the festival with a new name, Djakarta Warehouse Project.

2010
The 2010 edition of Djakarta Warehouse Project was held on 24 April. It was held at Pantai Carnaval, Ancol.
Lineup
Ferry Corsten
Kaskade
Marco V
Fischerspooner
Dash Berlin
Shortee Blitz
Lifelike

2011
The 2011 edition was held on 9 December. It was held at Tennis Indoor & Outdoor Senayan.
Lineup

Bob Sinclar
Roger Sanchez
Chuckie
Cosmic Gate
Emma Hewitt 
DJ Jazzy Jeff
Ladytron 
Fred Falke
Moonlight Matters
Angger Dimas
Bone
Cream feat. Kyrizz
Justeen & w.W
Yasmin & Princess Joanna
Sixteen
Bima G
Imam Darto
Anton Wirjono & Dipha
Bottlesmoker 
Aay & Joyo & Hizkia
Hogi Wirjono feat. David Naif & Andin 
Groove Monkeyz feat. Indra Aziz & Bonita & Joey 21st Night 
Agnes Monica 
Sherina 
Ello

2012
The 2012 edition was held on 7 December. It was held at Istora Senayan.
Line-up

Avicii
Calvin Harris
Paul van Dyk
Knife Party
Markus Schulz
A-Trak
Porter Robinson
Brodinski
Gesaffelstein
Late Night Alumni 
Nina Kraviz
Angger Dimas
Turn On Plastic feat. Anton & Hogi Wirjono 
Winky Wiryawan
Jerome
Soul Menace Soundsystem feat. Cream & P-Double
Creme de la Creme feat. Wizkia & w.W
Midnight Quickie
Massive Kontrol
Aay
Joyo
Juzteen
DYMZ
Anzamarch

2013
The 2013 edition was held on 13 December. It was held at Eco Park Ancol.
Line-up

David Guetta
Alesso
Arty
Breakbot
Flight Facilities
Gareth Emery
Lemaitre
Madeon
Martin Solveig
Seth Troxler
Showtek
Solomun
W&W
Zedd
Angger Dimas
Aay
Anton Wirjono
Bone Fiol
Dipha Barus 
D.U.A
Dunno
Eve
Hizkia
Hogi Wirjono
Joyo
Justeen
LTN
Mjolnir
Osvaldo Nugroho
Riri Mestica
Rummy
Schuldzt
Six Pratama
Sliqq
Smile Commanders
Yasmin
w.W

2014
The 2014 edition was held in two days for the first time. It was held on 12 and 13 December at JIExpo.
Line-up

12 Dec
Damian Lazarus
Ferry Corsten
Laidback Luke
Martin Garrix
Maya Jane Coles
New World Punx
Ørjan Nilsen
Showtek
Skrillex
Steve Angello
Twrk

13 Dec
Above & Beyond
Adventure Club
Blasterjaxx
Bondax
DVBBS
Kaskade
Matthew Koma
Nervo
Nicky Romero
Peking Duk
Rasmus Faber feat. Frida Sundemo
Steve Aoki

2015
The 2015 edition was held at JIExpo, Kemayoran, North Jakarta on 11 and 12 December.
Line-up

Andrew Rayel
Armin van Buuren
Axwell Λ Ingrosso
Cashmere Cat
Claptone
Claude VonStroke
Dillon Francis
DJ Snake
Duke Dumont
DVBBS
Gabriel & Dresden
Galantis
Headhunterz
Jack Ü
Jamie Jones
Kaskade
Major Lazer
Oliver Heldens
Philip George
Porter Robinson 
R3hab
Sied van Riel
Tiesto
What So Not

2016
The 2016 edition of Djakarta Warehouse Project was held on 9 and 10 December 2016 at JIExpo, Kemayoran, North Jakarta.
Line-up

9 Dec
Alan Walker
Brennan Heart
Christina Novelli
Destructo
Jason Ross
Kshmr
MaRLo
Martin Garrix
Rudimental
Snakehips
Tokimonsta
Valentino Khan
Yves V
Marc Benjamin
Zedd

10 Dec
Blasterjaxx
Carl Cox
DJ Snake
Duke Dumont
GTA
Hardwell
Hot Since 82
Lost Frequencies
Tiga
Ummet Ozcan
W&W
Yellow Claw

2017
The 2017 edition was held on 15 and 16 December at JIExpo, Kemayoran, North Jakarta.
Line-up

Bassjackers
Cesqeaux
David Gravell
Desiigner
DVBBS
Flosstradamus
Flume 
Galantis
Hardwell
Ilan Bluestone
Loco Dice
Djsky 
Marshmello
W&W Presents NWYR
Ookay
Sander van Doorn's Purple Haze
R3hab
Richie Hawtin
Robin Schulz
Slander
Steve Aoki
Tiesto
Vini Vici
Zatox
Zeds Dead

Special guests
Rich Chigga
Keith Ape
Higher Brothers
Joji

2018: DWP X
The 2018 edition was held on 7 to 9 December. It was held in Bali for the first time at Garuda Wisnu Kencana Cultural Park.
Line-up
Live
The Weeknd

DJ

Afrojack
Alesso
Andre Dunant
Andy Chunes x Wisdy
Armin van Buuren
Aydra
Baauer
Bassjackers
Busta-Row
Chace
Claptone
Crisis Era
Devarra
Dheews
Dipha Barus
DJ Snake
DJL
Evan Virgan
Fadi x Mikey Moran
Flip
Frontliner
Fun on a Weekend
Goldfish & Blink
Gorgon City
Hizkia
IZL
Jax Jones
Kenny Gabriel
Kimokal
Kris Kross Amsterdam
Kshmr
Kungs
Lost Frequencies
Major Lazer Soundsystem
Maliki
Marc Benjamin
MaRLo
Miss Lee
Mura Masa
Ørjan Nilsen
Patricia Schuldtz
Patrix Johnson
Porter Robinson 
Ride
RING
RL Grime
Showtek
Slushii
Soltice
Stan
Trillions
TroyBoi
w.W
Whethan

2019
The 2019 edition saw its return to Jakarta. It was held on 13 to 15 December 2019 at Jakarta International Expo.
The line-up includes:

Calvin Harris
Disclosure
Martin Garrix
Skrillex
Zedd
Bassjackers
Blasterjaxx
Brennan Heart
Cash Cash
Chromeo
Claptone
Coone
Jeffrey Sutorius
Jonas Blue
Krewella
Markus Schulz
Martin Solveig
Mattn
Oliver Heldens
R3hab
Tinashe
Yellow Claw

See also
Music festivals

References

Electronic music festivals in Indonesia
Annual events in Indonesia
Tourist attractions in Jakarta
Counterculture festivals